Belokrinitskoe soglasie is the largest and one of the most 'temperate' and 'optimistic' denominations among the Popovtsy Old Believers. The name derives from the name of the village Belokrinitsa, where the full hierarchy of the Russian Orthodox Oldrite Church was established.

From the end of 1840, when the Belokrinitskaya Hierarchy was accepted by the Belokrinitskoe soglasie these two terms became almost synonymous (at least when spoken about Old Believers in Russia, but not in Austria-Hungary, Romania and Moldova). In the 20th century the term Belokrinitskoe soglasie is synonymous with Russian Orthodox Old-Rite Church.

Some confusions may occur when using the term Belokrinitskoe soglasie in respect to a schism of Okruzhniki and Neokruzhniki. From one point of view, both sides of a schism originated from the Rogozhskoe cemetery administrative system and so both belong to the Belokrinitskoe soglasie From the other side, the Rogozhskoe cemetery priests and authorities were Okruzhniki almost entirely, so the term Belokrinitskoe soglasie can sometimes mean Okruzhniki.

See also
 Old Believers
 Russian Orthodox Old-Rite Church
 Belokrinitskaya Hierarchy

References and select bibliography

 S. G. Vurgraft, I. A. Ushakov. Staroobriadchestvo. Litsa, predmety, sobytiia i simvoly. Opyt entsiklopedicheskogo slovaria [The Old Believers: Figures, Subjects, Events and Symbols. An Encyclopedic Dictionary] Moscow: Tserkov, 1996.
 Зеньковский С.А. Русское старообрядчество, том I и II, Москва 2006 / Zenkovskij S.A. “Russia’s Old Believers”, part I and II, Moscow 2006

Old Believer movement